Majed Mashaan Ghanem Moqed (also transliterated as Moqued) (June 18, 1977 – September 11, 2001) was one of five hijackers of American Airlines Flight 77 as part of the September 11 attacks.

A Saudi, Moqed was studying law at a university in Saudi Arabia before joining Al-Qaeda in 1999 and being chosen to participate in the 9/11 attacks. He arrived in the United States in May 2001 and helped with the planning of how the attacks would be carried out.

On September 11, 2001, Moqed boarded American Airlines Flight 77 and assisted in the hijacking of the plane so that it could be crashed into the Pentagon.

Early life and activities
Moqed was a law student from the small town of Al-Nakhil, Saudi Arabia (west of Medina), studying at King Fahd University's Faculty of Administration and Economics. Before he dropped out, he was apparently recruited into al-Qaeda in 1999 along with friend Satam al-Suqami, with whom he had earlier shared a college room. 

The two trained at Khalden, a large training facility near Kabul that was run by Ibn al-Shaykh al-Libi.  A friend in Saudi Arabia claimed he was last seen there in 2000, before leaving to study English in the United States. In November 2000, Moqed and Suqami flew into Iran from Bahrain together.

Some time late in 2000, Moqed traveled to the United Arab Emirates, where he purchased traveler's cheques presumed to have been paid for by 9/11 financier Mustafa Ahmed al-Hawsawi.  Five other hijackers also passed through the UAE and purchased travellers cheques, including Wail al-Shehri, Saeed al-Ghamdi, Hamza al-Ghamdi, Ahmed al-Haznawi and Ahmed al-Nami.

Known as al-Ahlaf during the preparations, Moqed then moved in with hijackers Salem al-Hazmi, Abdulaziz al-Omari and Khalid al-Mihdhar in an apartment in Paterson, New Jersey.

2001
According to the FBI, Moqed first arrived to the United States on May 2nd 2001.With Ahmed al-Ghamdi

Later that year, Moqed, Hani Hanjour, Hazmi and Ahmed al-Ghamdi rented a minivan and travelled to Fairfield, Connecticut.  There they met a contact in the parking lot of a local convenience store who provided them with false IDs. (This was possibly Eyad Alrababah, a Jordanian charged with document fraud).

Moqed was one of the five hijackers who asked for a state identity card on August 2, 2001.  On August 24, both Mihdhar and Moqed tried to purchase flight tickets from the American Airlines online ticket-merchant, but had technical difficulties resolving their address and gave up.

Employees at Advance Travel Service in Totowa, New Jersey later claimed that Moqed and Hanjour had both purchased tickets there.  They claimed that Hani Hanjour spoke very little English, and Moqed did most of the speaking.  Hanjour requested a seat in the front row of the airplane.  Their credit card failed to authorize, and after being told the agency did not accept personal cheques, the pair left to withdraw cash.  They returned shortly afterwards and paid $1842.25 total in cash.
During this time, Moqed was staying in Room 343 of the Valencia Motel. On September 2, Moqed paid cash for a $30 weekly membership at Gold's Gym in Greenbelt, Maryland.

Three days later he was seen on an ATM camera with Hani Hanjour.  After the attacks, employees at an adult video store, Adult Lingerie Center, in Beltsville claimed that Moqed had been in the store three times, although there were no transactions slips that confirmed this.

Attacks

On September 11, 2001, Moqed arrived at Washington Dulles International Airport.

According to the 9/11 Commission Report, Moqed set off the metal detector at the airport and was screened with a hand-wand. He passed the cursory inspection, and was able to board his flight at 7:50. He was seated in 12A, adjacent to Mihdhar who was in 12B.  Moqed helped to hijack the plane and assisted Hani Hanjour in crashing the plane into the Pentagon at 9:37 A.M., killing 189 people (64 on the plane and 125 on the ground).

The flight was scheduled to depart at 08:10, but ended up departing 10 minutes late from Gate D26 at Dulles.  The last normal radio communications from the aircraft to air traffic control occurred at 08:50:51. At 08:54, Flight 77 began to deviate from its normal, assigned flight path and turned south, and then hijackers set the flight's autopilot heading for Washington, D.C. Passenger Barbara Olson called her husband, United States Solicitor General Theodore Olson, and reported that the plane had been hijacked and that the assailants had box cutters and knives.  At 09:37, American Airlines Flight 77 crashed into the west facade of the Pentagon, killing all 64 aboard (including the hijackers), along with 125 on the ground in the Pentagon.  In the recovery process at the Pentagon, remains of all five Flight 77 hijackers were identified through a process of elimination, as not matching any DNA samples for the victims, and put into custody of the FBI.

After the attacks his family told Arab News that Moqed had been a fan of sports, and enjoyed travelling. Additionally, the U.S. announced it had found a "Kingdom of Saudi Arabia Student Identity Card" bearing Moqed's name in the rubble surrounding the Pentagon. They also stated that it appeared to have been a forgery.

See also
 PENTTBOM
 Hijackers in the September 11 attacks

References

External links
 The Final 9/11 Commission Report
 Photo gallery

2001 deaths
American Airlines Flight 77
Participants in the September 11 attacks
Saudi Arabian al-Qaeda members
1977 births
Saudi Arabian mass murderers
Saudi Arabian murderers of children
Suicides in Virginia